The 1935 Delaware State Hornets football team represented the State College for Colored Students—now known as Delaware State University—in the 1935 college football season. In their second of three seasons in the Middle Atlantic Athletic Association, Delaware State posted a 7–1 record under coach Edward Jackson, outscoring their opponents 203 to 29. They clinched their second consecutive conference title after defeating .

Schedule

Notes

References

Delaware State
Delaware State Hornets football seasons
Delaware State Hornets football